Billy McConnell (born 24 December 1986) is an Australian motorcycle racer. He is signed for the OMG Racing team to ride their BMW S1000RR in the British National Superstock 1000 Championship, completing the team with Superbike riders Luke Mossey and Héctor Barberá. McConnell missed races at the start of the 2019 season due to illness.

He won the 2014 British Supersport Champion aboard a Triumph Daytona 675 for Smiths Racing before stepping up with the Smiths Racing team to the British Superbike Championship aboard a BMW S1000RR.  During 2017 he rode a Kawasaki ZX-10R in the British Superbike Championship, but was injured at the Thruxton round in August and was unable to compete in any further races. His place was taken for the last three races of the season in October at the Brands Hatch round by Kyle Ryde, who had parted company with his Pucetti Kawasaki Racing team in World Supersport due to poor performances.

Arrival in the UK
In 2004 McConnell was invited by Yamaha to compete in the British Superstock Cup, after a third-place finish in the Australian Superstock Championship despite missing the last 3 rounds.

In 2005 he competed in the Virgin Mobile Cup, winning the title and subsequently progressed to the full Virgin Mobile Superbike team. McConnell also won the Australian Young Sports Personality of the Year.

British Superbikes/Supersport
In 2006 McConnell rode at Virgin mobile Yamaha alongside Tommy Hill and Kieran Clarke. He had a decent season winning the rookie of the year award. 
In 2007 he moved down a class to the British Supersport Championship.
In 2008 he moved back to the British Superbike Championship with MSS Discovery Kawasaki, finishing 12th overall in the championship with 91 points. 
In 2009 he moved once again back to the British Supersport Championship, on the MAP Raceways Yamaha.

Career statistics

British Superbike Championship

Races by year

British Supersport Championship

Races by year

Notes:
1. – Race was abandoned after second restart, half points awarded.

Supersport World Championship

Races by year

References

External links
 Personal Website
 BSS Profile

Australian motorcycle racers
British Supersport Championship riders
British Superbike Championship riders
1986 births
Living people
Supersport World Championship riders